Jingle Jangle: A Christmas Journey is a 2020 American Christmas musical fantasy film written and directed by David E. Talbert. Choreographed by Ashley Wallen, it stars Forest Whitaker, Keegan-Michael Key, Hugh Bonneville, Anika Noni Rose, Phylicia Rashad, Lisa Davina Phillip, Ricky Martin, and Madalen Mills. The film, which was originally planned as a stage production, received ten nominations, the most at the 52nd NAACP Image Awards.

The film was released on Netflix on November 13, 2020.

Plot
Jeronicus Jangle—an inventor, toymaker, and owner of Jangles and Things—receives the final component to his latest invention that he believes will change his and his family's lives forever. This component helps create Don Juan Diego, a sentient matador doll. Jeronicus leaves to celebrate, leaving Diego and the store under the care of his apprentice Gustafson. Diego is distraught to learn that he will be mass-produced, thus robbing him of his uniqueness. He manages to convince Gustafson, an aspiring inventor himself, to get back at Jeronicus by taking Diego and his book of inventions.

Without proof of Gustafson's actions to show to the police, Jangles and Things falls into financial hardship while Gustafson starts his own factory. After the death of his wife Joanne, Jeronicus grows distant from his daughter, Jessica, who moves away.

30 years later, Jangles and Things is a failing pawnbroker shop and Jeronicus has completely lost his creative spark. He is visited by postwoman Ms. Johnston who is sympathetic to his plight and smitten with him as she tries to lift his spirits. Jeronicus is visited by banker Mr. Delacroix who tells him to pay his debts or produce a new invention to show to the bank by Christmas or lose his shop.

Meanwhile, it is revealed that Jessica now has a daughter named Journey who shares Jeronicus’ passion for inventing. A letter arrives for Jessica from Jeronicus, and Jessica sends Journey to stay with him until Christmas. Upon arriving, Jeronicus seems uninterested in her, though agrees to let her stay. Gustafson, now a famous toy tycoon, has exhausted all inventions from Jeronicus’ book. At a party, Gustafson unveils a toy of his own design that he has been trying to perfect called the Twirly Whirly, though it malfunctions and attacks one of the guests. Diego convinces Gustafson to steal another invention of Jeronicus’.

Jeronicus is busy working on his next toy, The Buddy 3000, which Journey discovers was conceived and designed by Jessica, and she resolves to get it to work. That night, she is caught in Jeronicus’ workshop by his assistant, Edison. Together, they find Buddy's body in Jeronicus’ workshop, and after putting in the mechanism that Jeronicus was working on, Buddy comes to life. Jeronicus hears the commotion and enters, causing Buddy to shut down. After sending Journey to bed, he laments about his estrangement from his daughter, the loss of his wife, and the memories he used to share with them.

Journey and Edison discover that Buddy has been stolen by Gustafson. They manage to infiltrate Gustafson's factory, where he conducts a failed unveiling of Buddy. Gustafson orders Buddy destroyed, though Journey and Edison are able to retrieve it before it can happen. After realizing Journey and Edison have gone missing, Jeronicus goes to the factory. With help from Jeronicus and Buddy, Journey and Edison are able to escape the factory, though Buddy is severely damaged as a result. Ms. Johnston arrives to help them escape Gustafson and his guards.

Journey reveals to Jeronicus that she wrote to Jessica on his behalf, wanting to get to know him. Wanting to do right by Journey and Jessica, who arrives in town to retrieve Journey, he gets to work on fixing Buddy. Jessica confronts Jeronicus over his neglect for her, though he unveils hundreds of unsent letters to her that he couldn't bring himself to send. After making amends, Jessica helps Jeronicus fix Buddy overnight.

Jeronicus and his family are confronted by Gustafson, Diego, and the police, and accused of stealing Buddy from him, though Journey disproves this. Jeronicus removes the life-giving component from Diego for reprogramming. As Gustafson is arrested, Jeronicus gives Gustafson the missing component for his Twirly he wanted to give him years back, which he would've given if he was patient. Mr. Delacroix arrives in the store and sees Buddy, and promises to give Jeronicus funding for any invention he desires to make.

The story is shown to be told by an older Journey to her grandchildren and she unveils a still functional Buddy to them. She flies them to the Jangle-owned factory where Gustafson's factory once stood. At the end credits, a book montage of Jangles and Things going back into business, Gustafson finally perfecting his Twirly Whirly in his cell, Diego's doll being mass-produced, and the opening of Jangle's factory.

Cast

Production
On December 7, 2017, Netflix bought a pitch from David E. Talbert entitled Jingle Jangle, with Talbert signed on to write and direct the Christmas musical. On September 17, 2018, it was announced that John Legend and Mike Jackson signed on as producers alongside David E. Talbert, and Lyn Sisson-Talbert for Brillstein Entertainment Partners. Ty Stiklorius will executive produce. In October 2018, Forest Whitaker joined the cast of the film. In April 2019, Keegan-Michael Key, Phylicia Rashad, Anika Noni Rose and Madalen Mills joined the cast. In July 2019, Hugh Bonneville joined the cast. In October 2020, it was revealed that Ricky Martin joined the cast.

The film's musical score includes songs by John Legend and Philip Lawrence.

Principal photography began in June 2019 in Norwich.

Music

All of the scores were composed by John Debney.

The leading two tracks from the Jingle Jangle: A Christmas Journey soundtrack are "This Day"performed by Usher and Kiana Ledé, which was also led by Usher who helped produced a 'Global Behind the Mic' version performed by the international voiceover cast from the film in different languages and "Square Root of Possible" performed by Madalen Mills, which was listed and considered a possible contender and sourced as a prediction of an Oscar nomination for the 2021 Academy Awards for Best Original Song by various entertainment news articles. Although it has been considered in the early tossup predictions, The Academy of Motion Picture Arts and Sciences announced that "Make It Work" made the shortlist for Best Original Song to be voted for a nomination as well as Best Original Score. However, each musical selections that were considered, did not make it into the official Oscar nominations. A special music video and remix recorded version of "Square Root of Possible" is performed by America's Got Talent's finalists, The Ndlovu Youth Choir of South Africa provided by Netflix YouTube channel for Africa, AfricaonNetflix.

Release
The film was released to select theaters and on Netflix on November 13, 2020.

Reception

Critical response 
The website's critics consensus reads, "Jingle Jangle: A Christmas Journey celebrates the yuletide season with a holiday adventure whose exuberant spirit is matched by its uplifting message." On Metacritic, it has a weighted average score of 69 out of 100 based on 15 critics, indicating "generally favorable reviews".

Richard Roeper of Chicago Sun-Times gave the film 3.5 out of 4 stars and wrote, "So much movie packed into one story, but the universally appealing performances and the show-stopping musical numbers carry the day." Leah Greenblatt of Entertainment Weekly gave the film a B+ and described it as "a sprawling musical extravaganza whose candy-colored, dandily overstuffed revelry spills over with joy and jubilance and every other happy J-word."

Accolades

Children's book 
Following the success of the feature film, David E. Talbert and his wife, Lyn Sisson-Talbert co-authored and released a 32-page picture book for children titled The Square Root of Possible: A Jingle Jangle Story in December 2020.

See also
 List of Christmas films

References

External links
 
 
 

2020s musical films
2020s Christmas films
American Christmas films
American musical films
2020s English-language films
English-language Netflix original films
Films directed by David E. Talbert
Films produced by John Legend
Films scored by John Debney
Christmas musicals
2020s American films
American science fantasy films